Neopilio is a genus  of harvestmen in the family Neopilionidae. It is the sole member of the monotypic subfamily Neopilioninae. 

The following species are recognised in the genus Neopilio:
 Neopilio australis  Lawrence, 1931
 Neopilio inferi  Lotz, 2011

References 

Harvestmen
Monogeneric subfamilies